The Orrin B. Hartley House is a historic residence located in Hood River, Oregon, United States.

The house was listed on the National Register of Historic Places in 1989.

See also

National Register of Historic Places listings in Hood River County, Oregon

References

External links

1907 establishments in Oregon
Buildings and structures in Hood River, Oregon
Colonial Revival architecture in Oregon
Houses completed in 1907
Houses in Hood River County, Oregon
Houses on the National Register of Historic Places in Oregon
National Register of Historic Places in Hood River County, Oregon